Oil City is a city in Venango County, Pennsylvania, United States. Known for its prominence in the initial exploration and development of the petroleum industry, it is located at a bend in the Allegheny River at the mouth of Oil Creek.

Initial settlement of Oil City was sporadic, and tied to the iron industry. After the first oil wells were drilled in 1861, it became central to the petroleum industry while hosting headquarters for the Pennzoil, Quaker State, and Wolf's Head motor oil companies.

Tourism plays a prominent role in the region by promoting oil heritage sites, nature trails, and Victorian architecture. The population was 9,608 at the 2020 census, and it is the principal city of the Oil City, PA Micropolitan Statistical Area.

History

Cornplanter Tract and Oil Creek Furnace
In 1796, the state of Pennsylvania gave Cornplanter, chief of the Wolf Band of the Seneca nation,  of land along the west bank of the Allegheny River in Warren County, Pennsylvania, as well as a small tract on both sides of the mouth of Oil Creek, in compensation for his services during the American Revolutionary War. Francis Halyday (or Holliday) purchased this land in 1803, and settled there with his family. The first white child known to be born in what became Oil City was James Halyday, born January 13, 1809. Three or four other families soon settled on the east side of the creek above the "Cornplanter Tract". Cornplanter sold the eastern half of his tract to two white settlers, William Connely and William Kinnear, in May 1818. Connely sold his quarter of the original tract back to Cornplanter in October 1818, but the land was seized by the county for nonpayment of taxes and sold at auction in November 1819 to Alexander McCalmont. McCalmont sold his land to Mathias Stockberger in the spring of 1824.

On June 25, 1824, Kinnear, Stockerberger, and settler Richard Noyes formed William Kinnear & Co., a company which swiftly erected an iron bloomery, foundry, gristmill, and several warehouses. A mill race provided water power for the furnace. Homes were built for workers, and a steamboat landing constructed on the Allegheny River. This settlement was called Oil Creek Furnace. Settler James Young opened the first general store in town, and operated it in the 1850s. The original incorporators were bought out by brothers William and Frederick Crary in January 1825. The company was purchased in February 1835 by William Bell, who changed the corporate name to W. Bell & Son. He and his son, Samuel, operated the furnace until 1849, employing about 40 men. The poor quality of iron ore in the area made their operations unprofitable and the furnace closed in 1849. The settlement was soon deserted, except for two families (the Bannons and the Halydays).

Deserted Oil Creek Furnace
The bend in the Allegheny River at Oil City slowed the speed of the river's waters, providing a spot for barges and rafts to land easily. For many years, the Bannons and Halydays rented rooms in their homes and space in their barns to bargemen and rafters using the landing at Oil Creek Furnace. About 1852 or 1853, Thomas Moran settled in the area and built a large inn (Moran House) next to the Bannon home. It proved popular and soon expanded, and became a local landmark. Samuel Hopewell opened a second inn shortly after Moran, and in the fall 1852 his brother, John P. Hopewell, opened a third inn and a new general store on Main Street. Settler Hiram Gordon opened the Red Lion, the area's first saloon, about the same time Hopewell's store began operation. Located near the mouth of Oil Creek, the saloon provided live entertainment. In June 1856,  of the property was sold by the Bell heirs to Graff, Hasson & Company. James Hasson, son William Hasson, and William's family took up residence on the tract and began farming.

Although the village of Oil Creek Furnace was largely deserted, settlement continued in the area. On August 6, 1840, Benjamin Thompson patented nearly all of what is now Oil City east of Oil Creek and north of the Allegheny. This land was quickly subdivided and sold to other settlers. With the death of his mother in 1844, James Halyday sold his land about 1846 to Dr. John Nevins and several other settlers. Nevins was a physician, the first to practice medicine in the area. James Hollis patented  of land on the south side of the Allegheny River in 1851, and purchased the remainder of Thompson's land on January 3, 1853. Hollis, in turn, sold all his land on April 25 to Henry Bastian.

Laytonia, Cottage Hill, Imperial City, and Leetown
Edwin L. Drake drilled the first commercially successful oil well in nearby Titusville on August 27, 1859. Oil was struck on the Downing farm south of the river by Phillips & Vanusdall in April 1861. Oil City had fewer than six families living there in 1859. The discovery of oil changed that. By 1868, a number of boomtowns had emerged in the region, including Oil City, Petroleum Center, Pithole, Rynd Farm, and Titusville. By 1860, the oil trade was far and away the dominant industry in the Oil City area. A machine shop (which constructed pipe fittings), warehouses, and other industrial structures were built on the west side of Oil Creek. Barges were used to transport oil down Oil Creek and into Oil City, where it was transferred to steamboats or bulk barges to continue on to Pittsburgh and other locations.

In 1859, Nevins sold his property to the Michigan Rock Oil Company, which built Main Avenue, platted an unnamed town around it, and erected a few buildings. On March 26, 1863, Henry Bastian sold his land to William L. Lay. Lay established a ferry near what is now the foot of Central Avenue. Lay platted a town of 80 lots near his ferry's landing on the south shore, and named the town Laytonia (sometimes referred to as "Laytona" or "Latona"). The same year, Charles Haines and Joseph Martin bought out the Hassons (who had continued to farm their land), and graded Grove Avenue. The two built a number of homes along the street, calling their settlement Cottage Hill. The United Petroleum Farms Association purchased part of Cottage Hill as well as an adjoining  in 1864. The company subdivided the land into lots and swiftly built homes here. In 1865, Vandergrift, Forman & Company, a petroleum exploration firm, bought the property of a number of settlers around the north landing of Lay's Ferry and established a town the company called Imperial City. West of Laytonia, Charles Lee established a settlement called Leetown.

Founding of Oil City
In 1862, residents in the area obtained a charter from the state, uniting the area north of the river as a borough named Oil City. South of the river, in particular, growth continued to be haphazard. Streets there often did not match up, hindering transportation. Residents realized that there were too many names in use for this area, which was causing problems. In 1866, the citizens of the borough south of the river petitioned Judge William G. Trunkey to give their borough a common name. He selected Venango City. By 1866, Venango City had a population of more than 1,500, and more than 4,500 people lived in Oil City.

Oil City began platting extensive areas of land between 1869 and 1872. This included the upper and lower south side, Palace Hill, upper Cottage Hill and Clark's Summit. Built in 1872, the Panic of 1873 devastated home sales on Clark's Summit. The funicular company went bankrupt, and the track was removed in 1879.

By 1870, residents of Oil City and Venango City desired unification of their joint, growing metropolis. They sought a town charter from the state, which was granted by the legislature on March 3, 1871. Oil City was the name of the unified boroughs. The first Oil City elections were held in April, and the first mayor, William M. Williams, and 12-member city council sworn in on April 11, completing the act of incorporation. Oil City replaced her charter with a new one in January 1881 after the state implemented a new township charter law. A city hall was erected later that year on Seneca Street.

Post-charter Oil City
The city was partially destroyed by flood in 1865 and by both flood and fire in 1866 and again in 1892; on this last occasion, several oil tanks that were struck by lightning gave way, and Oil Creek carried a mass of burning oil into the city, where some 60 people died and property valued at more than $1 million was destroyed. Oil City grew into a thriving community through the later half of the 19th century and into the 20th century. By the 1990s, Pennzoil, Quaker State, and Wolf's Head had all relocated their headquarters elsewhere. However, some oil wells continue to produce a steady supply of quality petroleum.

Regional governments and public organizations promote tourism by thoroughly educating the public about oil history.  Oil City's location along the Allegheny River in the foothills of the Appalachian Mountains provides excellent opportunities for exploring Northwestern Pennsylvania.

The Oil City Downtown Commercial Historic District, Oil City North Side Historic District, Oil City South Side Historic District, National Transit Building, and Oil City Armory are listed on the National Register of Historic Places.

Geography

Many layers of rock and sedimentary material containing fossils can be seen on the bluffs in and around Oil City.  Oil City is framed by the surrounding foothills with the Allegheny River winding through downtown.

The Allegheny River and Oil Creek freeze occasionally during the winter, sometimes causing ice jams; although remediation by the U.S. Army Corps of Engineers has reduced ice formation via a floating ice control structure on the river and a fixed concrete weir on the banks of the creek. Flooding of the river flats is a possibility throughout the year due to ice jams, excessive snow melt, large volume storms and hurricane or tropical storm remnants.

Demographics

As of the census of 2018, there were 9,749 people, 4,192 households, and 2,614 families residing in the city. The population density was 2,548.4 people per square mile (984.9/km2). There were 5,289 housing units at an average density of 1,168.8 per square mile (451.7/km2). The racial makeup of the city was 94.3% White, 0.9% African American, 0.10% Native American, 0.4% Asian, 0.04% Pacific Islander, 0.11% from other races, and 0.57% from two or more races. Hispanic or Latino of any race were 0.63% of the population.

There were 4,192 households, out of which 30.2% had children under the age of 18 living with them, 44.8% were married couples living together, 12.7% had a female householder with no husband present, and 37.4% were non-families. 32.7% of all households were made up of individuals, and 16.0% had someone living alone who was 65 years of age or older. The average household size was 2.37 and the average family size was 2.99.

In the city, the population was spread out, with 25.8% under the age of 18, 7.9% from 18 to 24, 27.2% from 25 to 44, 21.6% from 45 to 64, and 17.5% who were 65 years of age or older. The median age was 38 years. For every 100 females, there were 90.6 males. For every 100 females age 18 and over, there were 84.8 males.

The median income for a household in the city was $29,060, and the median income for a family was $42,839. Males had a median income of $30,072 versus $19,697 for females. The per capita income for the city was $14,696. About 16.2% of families and 19.0% of the population were below the poverty line, including 28.3% of those under age 18 and 12.4% of those age 65 or over.

Tourism 
Oil Creek State Park
Indian God Rock
St. Joseph Church
Oil City Armory
Oil City Northside
Oil City Southside
Arlington Hotel

Media 
WKQW 1120 AM and 96.3 FM are Venango County's only locally owned

Sports 
The Oil City Oilers were a Minor League Baseball team located in Oil City, Pennsylvania between 1940 and 1951. The team played in the Pennsylvania State Association from 1940 to 1942, and later moved to the Middle Atlantic League after World War II ended. The team began in 1940 when the Pittsburgh Pirates relocated their affiliate, the McKeesport Little Braves, to Oil City. The team stayed affiliated with the Pirates until 1947, when it began an affiliation with the Chicago White Sox. That year, the team's name was changed to the Oil City Refiners. The team's name was changed one last time to the Oil City A's, when they merged with the Youngstown A's, in 1951. The team then folded, along with the league, at the end of that season.

The Oilers name originated from the Oil City Oilers earlier team that represented the city in the 1985 and 1898 Iron And Oil League and the Oil City Cubs, who played as members of the Interstate League from 1906 to 1908.

Notable alumni 
 Otto Denning
 Mike Garbark
 Al Gionfriddo
 Elmer Klumpp
 Junior Walsh
 Hal Woodeshick
 Rudy York

Notable people
 Charles Almanzo Babcock – created  Bird Day, first celebrated in Oil City schools in 1894
George Carpenter – fighter ace during World War II
William Holmes Crosby, Jr. – one of the founding fathers of hematology
Francis "Gabby" Gabreski – fighter ace during World War II and a jet fighter ace during the Korean War. Gabreski was one of seven US pilots who were aces in both World War II and Korea. Leading US ace in Europe with 28 confirmed kills.
Jane Hajduk – wife of actor and comedian Tim Allen
Shauna Howe – 11-year-old murder victim in 1992, convictions 14 years later
Woody Jackson - composer and producer best known for his scores for successful video games
Joseph Levi - Pennsylvania state legislator and businessman
Ben Koyack – NFL player 2015–2019
Josephine McKim – 1932 Olympic gold medal-winning swimmer
Dusty Miller – MLB player in the 1890s
Major General George C. Rickards – Chief of the Militia Bureau (now National Guard Bureau) in 1920s
W.S Borland- American Sports Coach
Virgil Tupper- American Football Player
Ronald Black- American Politician
Scott Hutchinson- American Politician

See also

 Oil Creek Library District
 The Oil Region

References
Notes

Citations

Bibliography

External links

City website
Venango Area Chamber of Commerce
Artist relocation and arts revitalization

 
Cities in Pennsylvania
Cities in Venango County, Pennsylvania
History of the petroleum industry in the United States
Populated places established in 1824